At the Apollo is a live album and video release by Arctic Monkeys of the final concert of their 2007 world-tour, filmed in Manchester, England.

It was filmed on super 16mm film and in surround-sound. It was directed by Richard Ayoade and photographed by cinematographer Danny Cohen (This Is England). It was edited by Nick Fenton (Heima, All Tomorrow's Parties), and produced by Diarmid Scrimshaw (Dog Altogether, Tyrannosaur).

It has been awarded best music DVD 2009 by the NME. The music played in introduction credits was written by Bruno Nicolai, entitled 'Servizio fotografico' from the film The Red Queen Kills Seven Times starring Barbara Bouchet.

The film premiered on UK television on the music channel 4Music on 19 February 2009.

The DVD features a 'Multi Angle Camera View' of drummer Matt Helders.

DVD track listing
 "Brianstorm"
 "This House Is a Circus"
 "Teddy Picker"
 "I Bet You Look Good on the Dancefloor"
 "Dancing Shoes"
 "From the Ritz to the Rubble"
 "Fake Tales of San Francisco"
 "When the Sun Goes Down"
 "Nettles"
 "D Is for Dangerous"
 "Leave Before the Lights Come On"
 "Fluorescent Adolescent"
 "Still Take You Home"
 "Da Frame 2R"
 "Plastic Tramp" (with Miles Kane)
 "505" (with Miles Kane)
 "Do Me a Favour"
 "A Certain Romance"
 "The View from the Afternoon"
 "If You Were There, Beware"
Bonus tracks
 "Balaclava"
 "Bad Woman" (feat. Richard Hawley)

LP track listing 
Live In Texas - 7 June 2006

Side 1

 Riot Van
 The View From The Afternoon
 Still Take You Home
 You Probably Couldn't See For The Lights But You Were Staring Straight At Me
 Cigarette Smoker Fiona

Side 2

 Perhaps Vampires Is A Bit Strong But...
 Dancing Shoes
 I Bet You Look Good On The Dancefloor
 When The Sun Goes Down
 A Certain Romance

Personnel

Arctic Monkeys
Alex Turner – lead vocals (1–20, "Balaclava"), backing vocals ("Bad Woman"), guitar (1–14, 17–20, "Balaclava", "Bad Woman"), keyboards (16)
Jamie Cook – guitar, backing vocals (1, 4, 6–8, 13, 19)
Nick O'Malley – bass guitar, backing vocals (1–2, 7–8, 10–12, 14–15, 19, "Balaclava", "Bad Woman")
Matt Helders – drums, backing vocals (1–7, 10–15, 19, "Balaclava")

Guest musicians
Miles Kane – guitar (15–16)
Richard Hawley – lead vocals, tambourine ("Bad Woman")

References

External links

Arctic Monkeys live albums
2008 live albums
2008 video albums
Films directed by Richard Ayoade
Live video albums
Domino Recording Company live albums
Domino Recording Company video albums